The Kurdish-Turkish conflict spilled over into Iraqi Kurdistan in 1992, and has continued there intermittently since. The Turkish Armed Forces has launched a series of operations in Northern Iraq against the Kurdistan Workers' Party (PKK). More than 37,000 people have been killed in the conflict since 1984.

According to the Turkish government, the total number of Turkish fatalities in Iraq has been 275 dead and 739 injured. It claims to have killed 6,325 and captured 1,700 PKK guerrillas in the country.

The operations resulted in a permanent Turkish presence in northern Iraq since 2018. The Iraqi government views these operations as a violation of Iraq's sovereignty, with President Barham Salih demanding from Turkey their end and the withdrawal of all of the Turkish armed forces from his country's territory.

See also 
 Kurdish–Turkish_conflict_(1978–present) §External operations

References

History of the Kurdistan Workers' Party
Wars involving Turkey
 Cross-border operations of Turkey into Iraq
Iraq–Turkey relations
Lists of Turkish military personnel